The Zemurray Gardens Lodge Complex, in Tangipahoa Parish, Louisiana near Loranger, Louisiana, was built around 1925.  It was listed on the National Register of Historic Places in 1983.

History
The earliest record held in Tangipahoa Parish  describes an act of sale in the year 1822 as "the section of land on which Nathan Joiner now lives and was originally settled by Thomas Joiner." The Joiner family are believed to have first settled the property sometime in the 1790s. Further records from the Tangipahoa parish courthouse show that a man named Alfred Hennen purchased the Zemurray property sometime in 1828, in two different land sales, one 640-acre piece was purchased from William Cooper and another 640-acre plot from Moses Moore. The Hennen family built a large home on the property and is believed to be the source of the present structure.

The following is an excerpt from the National Register of Historic Places nomination:

The land title changed during the following years through various heirs and relatives. In one of the transactions the land was called "Hennen Retreat". In March 1888, the property of Ann Morris Hennen was auctioned to John Albert Morris of Westchester County, New York. The property was then donated to a man named Dave Morris and was renamed "Morris Retreat". Then in the year 1918, the property was sold to the Lake Superior Piling Corporation and was renamed "Holtonwood". Charles and William Holton, the new owners of the company renovated and greatly improved the property.

Samuel Zemurray
Sometime in October 1928, Samuel Zemurray from New Orleans, the president of the United Fruit Company at that time, purchased the property. Howard Schilling, a local parish farmer, was employed to manage the project. His wife Sarah Zemurray, an admirer of flowers instructed Schilling to plant many rows of azaleas and camellias along the forest trails. Samuel Zemurra saw the beauty created and decided to expand the project. Over the subsequent years, the gardens increased in beauty with a majestic scenery. In the mid-1900s, the Zemurray family hired a notable architect from New Orleans named Moise Goldstein and interior designer George Gallup to improve the property. Each spring, hundreds of tourists and people from the surrounding areas would travel to the garden.

Joiner Cemetery
The National Register nomination describes it as a narrow wooded driveway that leads from the highway to the garden entrance. Near the entrance to the garden is a small cemetery barely visible with a towering white monument. The inscription on the monument reads, "Nathan Joiner and Wife, First Settlers In the Home Place". 

References

National Register of Historic Places in Tangipahoa Parish, Louisiana
Buildings and structures completed in 1925
1925 establishments in Louisiana